Nadeem Z. H. Sheikh (born 31 August 1969) is a Canadian former cricketer.

Sheikh was born at Edmonton in August 1969. He was part of the Canadian squad for the 1997–98 Red Stripe Bowl, in which he played two List A one-day matches against Barbados and Guyana. Playing in the Canadian team as a medium-fast bowler, he took 3 wickets in his two matches, with best figures of 2 for 46. These List A matches for Canada marked his only appearances for the team. He later played in minor 20–over matches for Alberta in the 2008 Scotiabank National T20 Cricket Championship.

References

External links

1969 births
Living people
Sportspeople from Edmonton
Canadian cricketers